Meteoric water is the water derived from precipitation (snow and rain). This includes water from lakes, rivers, and icemelts, which all originate from precipitation indirectly. While the bulk of rainwater or meltwater from snow and ice reaches the sea through surface flow, a considerable portion of meteoric water gradually infiltrates into the ground.  This infiltrating water continues its downward journey to the zone of saturation to become a part of the groundwater in aquifers.

Overview 
Most groundwater is meteoric water. Other forms normally do not play a significant role in the hydrologic cycle. Non-meteoric forms of groundwater are connate water and magmatic water, also termed juvenile water. Connate water is trapped in rock strata at the time of formation. Because rock containing connate water is typically formed from ocean sediments, connate water is normally saline.  Magmatic water rises from great depth accompanying magma intrusion and affects mineralogy. In other words, meteoric water is the water that has fallen as rain and has filled up the porous and permeable shallow rocks, or percolate through them along bedding planes, fractures, and permeable layers.

History
The word "meteoric" (as in the sense of direct atmospheric origin) is used here from the same root as meteorology. The term is from a Greek word which originally referred to astronomical discussions. However, after the publication of Aristotle's book Meteorology, which discussed what we today call earth sciences, the term was eventually used to describe any notable changes appearing in the sky (including meteors, originally thought to be weather phenomena).

See also

Global meteoric water line
Optimum water content for tillage

References

Precipitation